Huff (also known as Hufftown, and later as Huff Community) is a ghost town in northeastern Archer County, Texas, United States. It is part of the Wichita Falls, Texas Metropolitan Statistical Area.

History
The town was named for Charles C. Huff, an attorney for the Wichita Falls and Southern Railway. In 1908, the railroad founded the town site as a switching site. Next to the tracks, they built a giant concrete cistern that held a rail tank car-full of water that the railroad hauled in for the community's source of fresh water.

A post office operated at Huff from 1909 to 1913, as did a blacksmith shop, a general store, and a school. By 1936, only a school and some scattered dwellings remained. The town site became a gathering place for area cattle ranchers, using the old school as a community center.

Geography
Lakeside City is located at  (33.7687113, -98.5372771).

References

Further reading
 Loftin, Jack, and the Archer County Historical Commission, (1979). - Trails Through Archer: A Centennial History, 1880-1980. - Burnet, Texas: Nortex Press/Eakin Publications. - 
 O'Keefe, Ruth Jones, (1969). - Archer County Pioneers: A History of Archer County. - Hereford, Texas: Pioneer Book Publishers. - OCLC 866802

External links
 Huff, Texas - Handbook of Texas

Populated places in Archer County, Texas
Wichita Falls metropolitan area
Ghost towns in North Texas